Now That's What I Call Music! 5 is the fifth edition of the Now! series released in the United States. It was released on November 14, 2000, peaked at number two on the Billboard 200 and certified 4× Platinum by the RIAA, to date the only non-Christmas album in the U.S. series to achieve that status.

Reception

AllMusic's Stephen Thomas Erlewine declares Now! 5 is "a Polaroid of the summer of 2000" and while pop music in general paled in comparison to the pop successes of the previous year, this volume "proves that it was a pretty good year after all." He calls "Aaron's Party (Come and Get It)" an embarrassing inclusion but maintains Now! 5 is "one of the better volumes in the American series."

Jim Farber for Entertainment Weekly has a different take, saying "Now That's What I Call Music! 5...compiles the crummiest singles crowding the airwaves" in 2000, making the pop music of the time "seem even drearier than it actually is."

Track listing

Chart performance

References

2000 compilation albums
 005
Sony Music compilation albums